Nina Aleksandrovna Zhivanevskaya (born 24 June 1977) is a 5-time Olympic backstroke swimmer from Russia, who has swum for Spain since 1999, following her marriage to a Spaniard (and moving to Spain).

She swam at the 1992 Olympics for the Unified Team, Russia at the 1996 Olympics, and Spain at the 2000, 2004 and 2008 Olympics. At the 1992 Games, she won a bronze medal in the 4×100 m medley relay, and was the youngest member of the Unified Team swimming squad (18 men and 11 women), with 15 years and 35 days.

She won the bronze medal in the 100 m backstroke a year later at the 2000 Olympics in Sydney, Australia.

Zhivanevskaya took part in the 2008 Olympic Games, reaching the semi-finals in the 100 m backstroke.  After this event, she announced she was retiring from the sport so that she could concentrate on her family.

See also
List of doping cases in sport
List of Spanish records in swimming
World record progression 50 metres backstroke

References

External links
 
 
 
 

1977 births
Living people
Soviet female freestyle swimmers
Russian female backstroke swimmers
Russian female freestyle swimmers
Spanish female backstroke swimmers
Spanish female freestyle swimmers
Russian emigrants to Spain
Soviet female backstroke swimmers
Olympic swimmers of Spain
Olympic swimmers of the Unified Team
Olympic swimmers of Russia
Swimmers at the 1992 Summer Olympics
Swimmers at the 1996 Summer Olympics
Swimmers at the 2000 Summer Olympics
Swimmers at the 2004 Summer Olympics
Swimmers at the 2008 Summer Olympics
Olympic bronze medalists for the Unified Team
Olympic bronze medalists for Spain
Doping cases in swimming
Russian sportspeople in doping cases
Sportspeople from Samara, Russia
World record setters in swimming
Olympic bronze medalists in swimming
World Aquatics Championships medalists in swimming
European Aquatics Championships medalists in swimming
Medalists at the 2000 Summer Olympics
Medalists at the 1992 Summer Olympics
Mediterranean Games gold medalists for Spain
Swimmers at the 2001 Mediterranean Games
Mediterranean Games medalists in swimming